Edward William Broad (30 April 1875 – 17 April 1913) was a New Zealand cricketer. Broad's batting style is unknown, though it is known he played as a wicket-keeper. He was born at Nelson, New Zealand.

Broad was educated at Nelson College from 1886 to 1892. He made a single first-class appearance for Nelson against Wellington at Trafalgar Park in December 1891. Broad ended Nelson's first-innings of 106 all out unbeaten on 0, while in Wellington's first-innings of 128 all out he took three catches. In Nelson's second-innings of 111 all out, he scored 13 runs before he was dismissed by William Ogier. In Wellington's one wicket victory, he also claimed a single catch in their second-innings chase.

He was struck by a train while riding his motor cycle across a level crossing at Marton, Manawatu, on 16 April 1913, and died of his injuries at Marton the next day. He left a widow, four sons and a daughter.

References

External links
Edward Broad at ESPNcricinfo
Edward Broad at CricketArchive

1875 births
1913 deaths
Cricketers from Nelson, New Zealand
New Zealand cricketers
Nelson cricketers
People educated at Nelson College
Road incident deaths in New Zealand
Wicket-keepers
Railway accident deaths in New Zealand
Motorcycle road incident deaths